Monachidium is a genus of grasshoppers belonging to the family Acrididae.

Species
The monotypic genus Monachidium lunum (Johannson, 1763) is found in tropical South America.

References

Acrididae genera
Taxa named by Jean Guillaume Audinet-Serville
Monotypic Orthoptera genera